Bahrain Lawal is a Bahraini government broadcaster. It broadcasts from the headquarters of the Bahrain Radio and Television Corporation, located in Isa Town.

References

Publicly funded broadcasters
Mass media in Manama
Mass media companies of Bahrain